Behind the Eight Ball is a 1942 American comedy film directed by Edward F. Cline and written by Stanley Roberts and Mel Ronson. The film stars Al Ritz, Jimmy Ritz, Harry Ritz, Carol Bruce, Dick Foran, Grace McDonald, Johnny Downs and William Demarest. The film was released on December 4, 1942, by Universal Pictures.

Plot

A summer stock theatre is plagued by a series of backstage murders and sabotage. When the latest group to play there arrives and is informed of the situation, the least talented members of the troupe,  The Ritz Brothers, are promoted to headliners under the reasoning that they are the most expendable.
Detective Demarest is tasked with investigating the murders, but is frequently hindered by The Ritz Brothers.

The Ritz Brothers become heroes upon their discovery of a secret room backstage that is being used as an Axis radio room.
Upon this victory, The Ritz Brothers finally make headlines as a result of their own efforts.

Cast        
Al Ritz as Al Jester
Jimmy Ritz as Jimmy Jester
Harry Ritz as Harry Jester
Carol Bruce as Joan Barry
Dick Foran as Bill Edwards
Grace McDonald as Babs
Johnny Downs as Danny
William Demarest as McKenzie
Richard Davies as Clay Martin
Russell Hicks as Harry B. Kemp
Vinton Hayworth as Bobby Leonard 
Sonny Dunham as Orchestra Leader

References

External links
 

1942 films
American comedy films
1942 comedy films
Universal Pictures films
Films directed by Edward F. Cline
American black-and-white films
1940s English-language films
1940s American films